Na Bratislavskej Lýre is the sixth compilation album by Marika Gombitová, released on OPUS in 2008.

Track listing

Official releases
 2008: Na Bratislavskej Lýre, CD, OPUS, #91 0016

Credits and personnel

 Marika Gombitová - lead vocal, writer
 Ján Lehotský - music, lead vocal
 Miroslav Žbirka - lead vocal
 Miroslav Jevčák - lead vocal
 Pavol Hammel - music
 Ján Lauko - music, producer

 Kamil Peteraj - lyrics
 Zoro Laurinc - lyrics
 Peter Guldan - lyrics
 Modus - chorus
 Milan Vašica - producer

References

General

Specific

External links 
 

2008 compilation albums
Marika Gombitová compilation albums